Nationality words link to articles with information on the nation's poetry or literature (for instance, Irish or France).

Events

 June 8 – English poet and Jesuit priest Gerard Manley Hopkins dies aged 54 in Dublin of typhoid; he is buried in Glasnevin Cemetery; most of his poetry remains unpublished until 1918.
 December 12 – English poet Robert Browning dies aged 77 at Ca' Rezzonico in Venice on the same day his book Asolando; Fancies and facts is published; he is buried in Poets' Corner in Westminster Abbey; Alfred, Lord Tennyson will be buried adjacently.

Works published

Canada
 William Wilfred Campbell, Lake lyrics and other poems (Saint John: J.& A. McMillan)
 Arthur Wentworth Hamilton Eaton, Acadian Legends and Lyrics, Canada
 Sophia Almon Hensley, Poems.
 James McIntyre, Poems of James McIntyre.
Anthologies
 Songs of the Great Dominion: Voices from the Forests and Waters, the Settlements and Cities of Canada. (London [England]: Walter Scott). 500-page anthology of Canadian poetry.

United Kingdom
 Wilfrid Scawen Blunt, A New Pilgrimage, and Other Poems
 Robert Bridges, The Feast of Bacchus
 Thomas Edward Brown, The Manx Witch, and Other Poems
 Robert Browning, Asolando; Fancies and facts
 Amy Levy, A London Plane–Tree, and Other Verse
 Walter Pater, Appreciations: With an Essay on Style, criticism
 Emily Pfeiffer, Flowers of the Night
 Algernon Charles Swinburne, Poems and Ballads, Third Series (see also First Series 1866; Second Series 1878)
 Arthur Symons, Days and Nights
 Alfred Lord Tennyson:
 Demeter and Other Poems
 He writes "Crossing the Bar" in October as he crosses the Solent
 Idylls of the King, complete edition of the Idylls, with final titles (see also Idylls of the King 1859, The Holy Grail 1869, Idylls of the King 1870, "The Last Tournament" 1871, Gareth and Lynette 1872, "Balin and Balan" in Tiresias 1885)
 W.B. Yeats, The Wanderings of Oisin and Other Poems, including "The Wanderings of Oisin", "The Song of the Happy Shepherd", "The Stolen Child", "Down By The Salley Gardens" (Kegan Paul, Trench & Company), Irish poet published in the United Kingdom

United States
 Eugene Field, A Little Book of Western Verse, including "Little Boy Blue" and "Wynkyn, Blynkyn and Nod", United States
 Louise Chandler Moulton, Poems
 Walt Whitman, Leaves of Grass, eighth edition

Other
 Giosuè Carducci, Barbarian Odes, Book 3, Italy
 Holger Drachmann, Sangenes Bog ("Book of Songs"), Denmark
 Herman Gorter, Mei ("May"), Netherlands
 Banjo Paterson, "Clancy of the Overflow", Australia
 Luigi Pirandello, Mal giocondo ("Playful Evil" or "Joyful Pain"), Italy
 Govardhanram N. Tripathi, Lilavatijivankala, a tribute to his dead daughter, Indian, writing in Gujarati
 Verner von Heidenstam, Vallfart och vandringsår ("Pilgrimage: the Wandering Years"), Sweden
 W.B. Yeats, The Wanderings of Oisin and Other Poems, including "The Wanderings of Oisin", "The Song of the Happy Shepherd", "The Stolen Child", "Down By The Salley Gardens" (Kegan Paul, Trench & Company) Irish poet published in the United Kingdom

Awards and honors

Births
Death years link to the corresponding "[year] in poetry" article:
 February 3 (January 22 O.S.) – Artur Adson (died 1977), Estonian poet and critic
 February 11 – Acharya Ramlochan Saran (died 1971), Indian, Maithili-language poet littérateur, grammarian, publisher and poet
 March 1 – Okamoto Kanoko, 岡本かの子, pen name of Ohnuki Kano (died 1939), Japanese, author, tanka poet, and Buddhist scholar in the Taishō and early Shōwa periods; mother of artist Tarō Okamoto
 April 27 – Arnulf Øverland (died 1968), Norwegian
 June 23
 Anna Andreyevna Akhmatova (died 1966), Russian
 Rofū Miki, 三木 露風, pen name of Masao Miki (died 1964), Japanese Symbolist poet and writer
 June 28 – Abbas Al Akkad عباس محمود العقاد (died 1964), Egyptian, Arabic-language writer and poet, a founder of the Divan school of poetry
 July 30 – Dorothy Wellesley, born Dorothy Violet Ashton and styled Lady Gerald Wellesley between 1914 and 1943 (died 1956), English socialite, author, poet and literary editor
 August 5 – Conrad Aiken (died 1973), American writer
 August 19 – Arthur Waley (died 1966), English Orientalist
 August 29 – (Doris) Capel Boake (died 1944), Australian writer
 September 13 – Pierre Reverdy (died 1960), French
 September 15 – Claude McKay (died 1948), Jamaican-born writer and poet of the Harlem Renaissance
 September 17 – Katka Zupančič (died 1967), Slovene children's poet
 September 29 – Matilde Hidalgo (died 1974), Ecuadorian physician, poet and women's rights activist
 October 31 – Napoleon Lapathiotis (died 1944), Greek
 November 11 – Mantarō Kubota, 久保田万太郎 (died 1963), Japanese author, playwright and poet (surname: Kubota)
 December 8 – Hervey Allen (died 1949), American writer
 December 24 – Patrick MacGill (died 1963), Irish-born "navvy poet" and journalist
 Also:
 Harley Matthews (died 1968), Australian
 John Munro (Iain Rothach; killed in action 1918), Scottish Gaelic
 V. C. Balakrishna Panikker (died 1915), Indian, Malayalam-language poet
 Vasilis Rotas (died 1977), Greek
 Fredegond Shove, née Maitland (died 1949), English

Deaths
Birth years link to the corresponding "[year] in poetry" article:
 March 25 – Cornelius Mathews, 71 (born 1817), American poet
 May 31 – Horatius Bonar, 80 (born 1808), Scottish hymnodist
 June 8 – Gerard Manley Hopkins, 44 (born 1844), English poet, in Ireland
 June 15 – Mihai Eminescu, 39 (born 1850), Romanian poet
 September 10 – Amy Levy, 27 (born 1861), English poet and novelist, by suicide
 September 18 – John Barr, 79 (born 1809), Scottish-born New Zealand poet
 September 23 – Eliza Cook, 70 (born 1818), English poet
 October 25 – Émile Augier, 69 (born 1820), French dramatist and poet
 November 18 – William Allingham, 65 (born 1824) Irish-born poet
 November 29 – Martin Farquhar Tupper, 79 (born 1810), English writer and poet
 December 10 – Ludwig Anzengruber, 50 (born 1839), Austrian dramatist, novelist and poet
 December 12 – Robert Browning, 77 (born 1812), English poet, in Italy
 December 23 – Constance Naden, 31 (born 1858), English poet and philosopher, of infection

See also

 19th century in poetry
 19th century in literature
 List of years in poetry
 List of years in literature
 Victorian literature
 French literature of the 19th century
 Symbolist poetry
 Poetry

Notes

19th-century poetry
Poetry